Song of Songs 3 (abbreviated  as Song 3) is the third chapter of the Song of Songs in the Hebrew Bible or the Old Testament of the Christian Bible. This book is one of the Five Megillot, a collection of short books, together with Ruth, Lamentations, Ecclesiastes and Esther, within the Ketuvim, the third and the last part of the Hebrew Bible. Jewish tradition views Solomon as the author of this book (although this is now largely disputed), and this attribution influences the acceptance of this book as a canonical text. This chapter contains a female song about her search for her lover at night and the poem describing King Solomon's procession.

Text
The original text is written in Hebrew language. This chapter is divided into 11 verses.

Textual witnesses
Some early manuscripts containing the text of this chapter in Hebrew are of the Masoretic Text, which includes the Aleppo Codex (10th century), and Codex Leningradensis (1008). Some fragments containing parts of this chapter were found among the Dead Sea Scrolls: 4Q106 (4QCanta); 30 BCE-30 CE; extant verses 3–5, 7–11), 4Q107 (4QCantb); 30 BCE-30 CE; extant verses 1–2, 5, 9–11), and 4Q108 (4QCantc); 30 BCE-30 CE; extant verses 7–8).

There is also a translation into Koine Greek known as the Septuagint, made in the last few centuries BCE. Extant ancient manuscripts of the Septuagint version include Codex Vaticanus (B; B; 4th century), Codex Sinaiticus (S; BHK: S; 4th century), and Codex Alexandrinus (A; A; 5th century).

Structure
New King James Version (NKJV) groups this chapter into:
 = A Troubled Night
 = The Coming of Solomon

Female: Search and seizure (3:1-5)
The first part of this chapter is "a tightly constructed song" of the female protagonist, describing how she looks for her lover at night (or in a dream) in the city streets, until she finds him and brings him into her mother's house. The setting of this poem progresses from the woman's bed (verse 1) to the public areas of the city (verses 2-4b) and finally to the privacy of her mother's bedroom (verses 4c-5). It closes with the second appeal to the 'daughters of Jerusalem'.

Verse 1
On my bed by night I sought him whom my soul loves;
I sought him, but found him not.
"By night" (ba-) can be read as "nightly" or "night after night": the word "refers to more nights than one".
The woman had expected her lover to return "before dawn"; Hudson Taylor notes that she might have regretted "lightly dismiss[ing] Him, with the thought: A little later I may enjoy His love ... Poor foolish bride!"

Verse 5
I charge you, O daughters of Jerusalem,
By the gazelles or by the does of the field,
Do not stir up nor awaken love
Until it pleases.
Cross references: Song of Songs 2:7; 8:4
"Charge" or "adjure"
The names of God are apparently substituted with similar sounding phrases depicting 'female gazelles' for [God of] hosts, and 'does of the field'/'wild does/female deer' (ha-) for God Almighty.

Male: Marriage scene (3:6-11)
This section starts a poetic exposition of love and marriage which form the core of the book (Song 3:6-5:1). Hess applies these six verses to the man, whereas Fox prefers the daughter of Jerusalem as the speakers, and the New King James Version assigns them to "the Shulamite" (= the woman).

Solomon is the focus of this section, as his name is mentioned three times (verses 7, 9 and 11), and the suffix 'his' (-o) refers to him once in verse 7, another in verse 9 and four times in the second part of verse 11. The last word of this part is 'his heart', referring directly to the essential aspect of King Solomon and the most relevant to the whole love poem. The mention of Solomon's mother in verse 11 is in line with the focus on mothers in the book, both the woman's (1:6; ;) and the man's (8:5).

See also
 Jerusalem
 Zion
Related Bible parts: Song of Songs 2

Notes

References

Sources

External links
 Jewish translations:
 Shir Hashirim - Song of Songs - Chapter 3 (Judaica Press) translation [with Rashi's commentary] at Chabad.org
 Christian translations:
 Online Bible at GospelHall.org (ESV, KJV, Darby, American Standard Version, Bible in Basic English)
 Song of Solomon Chapter 3 King James Version
  Various versions

03